Brymbo West Crossing Halt railway station was a station in Brymbo, Wrexham, Wales. The station was opened on 20 March 1905 and closed on 1 January 1931.

References

Disused railway stations in Wrexham County Borough
Railway stations in Great Britain opened in 1905
Railway stations in Great Britain closed in 1931
Former Great Western Railway stations
1905 establishments in Wales
1931 disestablishments in Wales